Rosensaft is a German surname. Notable people with the surname include:

Hadassah Rosensaft (1912–1997), Polish holocaust survivor
Josef Rosensaft (1911–1975), Holocaust survivor
Menachem Z. Rosensaft (born 1948), American attorney

German-language surnames